Gros Ventres Island is a former island in the U.S. state of North Dakota.

Gros Ventres Island was named after the Gros Ventre Indians.

References

Former islands
Landforms of McLean County, North Dakota
Islands of North Dakota